Ridouane Khalid (born 16 August 1967) is a French citizen who was held in extrajudicial detention in the United States Guantanamo Bay detention camps, in Cuba.

The Department of Defense says his birthdate is August 16, 1967.

Along with Khaled Ben Mustapha and Mustaq Ali Patel, he was the last French citizen held at the base. They were released in March 2005 and placed under formal investigation by a judge in Paris. Khalid has two brothers already under investigation for alleged terrorism-related matters.

Although originally convicted in France, his trial was overturned and he was released in February 2009.

Habeas corpus petition

A writ of habeas corpus, Redouane Khalid v. George W. Bush, was submitted on 
Redouane Khalid's behalf.

French trial
Redouane Khalid, and four other French citizens, were convicted in 2007 of "criminal association with a terrorist enterprise."
They had their convictions overturned on appeal on February 24, 2009.
Their convictions were overturned because they were based on interrogations conducted in Guantanamo, and the interrogations were conducted by French security officials, not law enforcement officials.

On February 17, 2010, the Court of Cassation, a higher court, ordered a re-trial of the five men.

References

External links
Al Jazeera: French judge detains pair freed by US

1967 births
Living people
French extrajudicial prisoners of the United States
French people of Algerian descent
French Muslims
Guantanamo detainees known to have been released